Bingle Bangle (stylized in all caps) is the fifth extended play by South Korean girl group AOA. It was released on May 28, 2018 by FNC Entertainment and distributed by Kakao M. It contains a total of six songs, including the title track "Bingle Bangle". This is the only release as a six member group, after Choa's departure in 2017, as well as the last release to feature member Mina following her departure from the group in May 2019.

Background and release
On April 18, 2018 FNC Entertainment confirmed that AOA would be returning as a group of six in May 2018, marking it their first comeback since Choa's departure in 2017. It was later confirmed that the group would be returning with their fifth mini album titled Bingle Bangle on May 28, 2018. On May 9, FNC Entertainment opened AOA's official instagram and began posting teasers for the comeback on May 10. Both individual and group teasers began to be released through their official instagram on May 10. And the tracklist was released on May 22. On May 28, the mini album was officially released along with the title track's "Bingle Bangle" music video.

Member Jimin participated in writing the lyrics for the album.

Promotion
AOA held a showcase on May 28 for the release of the mini album and performed their title track alongside "Super Duper".

They began performing the title track "Bingle Bangle" and "Super Duper" on South Korean music shows from May 31 on Mnet's M!Countdown.

Singles
"Bingle Bangle" was released as the title track in conjunction with the EP on May 28, 2018. The song was described as "a funky summer song with fresh and lively energy". "Bingle Bangle" reached No. 4 on Korea's Gaon Digital Chart and No. 3 on the K-Pop Hot 100.

Track listing

Charts

Release history

References

2018 EPs
AOA (group) EPs
Korean-language EPs
FNC Entertainment EPs